Adesmus divus is a species of beetle in the family Cerambycidae. It was described by Chabrillac in 1857. They can be found in Bolivia, Argentina, Paraguay and Brazil.

References

Adesmus
Beetles described in 1857